Charles-Irénée Castel, abbé de Saint-Pierre (18 February 1658 – 29 April 1743) was a French author whose ideas were novel for his times. His proposal of an international organisation to maintain peace was among the first in history, with possible exceptions such as George of Poděbrady's Tractatus (1462–1464) and Émeric Crucé. He influenced Rousseau and Kant.

Biography 
Saint-Pierre was born at the château of Saint-Pierre-Église near Cherbourg, where his father, the Marquis de Saint-Pierre, was grand bailli of Cotentin. He was educated by the Jesuits. The youngest of five children and unsuited to a military career owing to poor health, he became a priest.

He was introduced by family connections into the salons of Madame de la Fayette and the Marquise de Lambert in Paris. He was elected to the Académie française in 1695, although he had previously produced no notable work; his election was an episode in the Quarrel of the Ancients and the Moderns, Saint-Pierre being a clear representative of the latter. The same year he gained a footing at court as chaplain to Madame, the king's sister-in-law. From 1703 to his death, he was abbot of Tiron.

Contrary to a widely believed opinion, it is not while working as a negotiator of the Treaty of Utrecht (1712–13) that he developed his project of universal peace. Saint-Pierre worked on the idea from 1708 and published early versions from 1712.

In 1718, he published Discours sur la polysynodie, where he proposed that appointed ministers be replaced by elected councils. As a consequence of his criticism of the policy of Louis XIV (died 1715) he was expelled from the Académie later the same year.

In 1723, with Pierre-Joseph Alary he founded the Club de l'Entresol, an early modern think tank in Paris; the club was closed for political reasons in 1731.

He died in Paris on 29 April 1743 aged 85.

Ideas 
Saint-Pierre's works are centered on an acute and visionary criticism of politics, law and social institutions. He had a great influence on Rousseau, who left elaborate examinations of some of them, and was a forerunner of Kant's 1795 essay on perpetual peace. He can be seen as an early proponent of the ideas of the Enlightenment. His  which was destined to exercise considerable influence on the development of the various schemes for securing universal peace which culminated in the Holy Alliance, was published in 1713 in Utrecht, where he was acting as secretary to the French plenipotentiary, the Abbé de Polignac, and his  contained severe strictures on the government of Louis XIV, with projects for the administration of France by a system of councils for each department of government. His works include a number of memorials and projects for stopping duelling, equalizing taxation, treating mendicancy, reforming education and spelling, etc.

Saint-Pierre was one of the first to mention the possibility of a European union made by independent and autonomous states. His work on a European community directly inspired the idea of an international order based on the principle of collective self-defense, and was important to the creation of the Concert of Europe, and later the League of Nations, whose successor is the United Nations Organisation. Friederich the Great of Prussia wrote to Voltair on the 'Projet pour rendre la paix perpétuelle en Europe': "The Abbe de Saint-Pierre has sent me a fine work on how to re-establish peace in Europe. The thing is very practicable. All it lacks to be successful, is the consent of all Europe and a few other such small details."

Ideas contributed by Saint-Pierre include:
 an equitable tax system, including a graduated income tax,
 free public education, for women as well as men, 
 state improvement of transportation to further commerce,
 an international court and league of states (Projet de paix perpétuelle 1713),
 a constitutional monarchy, aided by a system of councils and an academy of experts (Discours sur la polysynodie 1718).

Works

Printed books 
 Ouvrages de morale et de politique. Rotterdam: J.-D. Beman ; Paris: Briasson, 1733–1740
 Projet pour rendre la paix perpétuelle en Europe. Utrecht: A. Schouten, 1713
 A lasting peace through the federation of Europe; and, The state of war English translation
 Discours sur la polysynodie. Amsterdam: Du Villard & Changuion, 1719
 Projet pour perfectionner l'éducation. Paris: Briasson, 1728
 Abrégé du projet de paix perpétuelle. Rotterdam: J.-D. Bernan, 1729.
 An Abridged Version of the Project for Perpetual Peace, ed. Roderick Pace, trans. Carmen Depasquale. Valletta: Midsea Books, 2009.  
 De la douceur. Amsterdam: Briasson, 1740
 André Robinet (ed.), Correspondance G. W. Leibniz, Ch. I. Castel de Saint-Pierre, Paris: Centre de philosophie du droit, 1995.

Correspondence 
Saint-Pierre exchanged letters with a number of luminaries of his time, including Voltaire. His letters often ended with the formula "Paradise to those who do good".

References

External links 
 Saint-Pierre’s biography at the Académie française   – Includes a portrait.
 Franco Spoltore, Abbé de Saint-Pierre. In The Federalist. Year XXXVI (1994) Number 3 - Page 221.
 

1658 births
1743 deaths
Expelled members of the Académie Française
18th-century French nobility
French political philosophers
People from Manche